The coat of arms of Zambia was adopted on 24 October 1964 when the Republic of Zambia reached its independence. This coat of arms is adapted from the arms of the British protectorate of Northern Rhodesia which dated to 1927, with the wavy black and white vertical lines as the field and the eagle (then holding a fish) in the chief. 

The African fish eagle represents the conquest of freedom and nation's hope for the future.  The hoe and pickaxe represent the country's economic backbone: agriculture and mining, as well as the characteristics that have influenced Zambia's evolution and nature. The shield is a representation of Victoria Falls with white water cascading over black rock. The Victoria Falls represents the Zambezi river, from which Zambia takes its name.  The coat of arms also has emblems of Zambia's natural resources: minerals and mining, agriculture and wildlife. The shield is supported by two figures which represent the common man and woman of the nation. The country's motto is "One Zambia, One Nation which emphasises the need for unity in a country of over 72 ethnic groups.

The wavy black and white vertical lines also were present in the shield of the coat of arms of the Federation of Rhodesia and Nyasaland 1954-1963.

References 
Vol.2
 

Zambia
National symbols of Zambia
Zambia
Zambia
Zambia
Zambia
Zambia
Zambia
Zambia